Reginald Ernest Henderson (1 December 1910 – 26 November 2003) was an Australian rules footballer who played with Richmond in the Victorian Football League (VFL).		
		
Henderson was a defender and occasional ruckman who joined Camberwell in 1931 from the Carnegie junior team. After several successful seasons at Camberwell he spent two seasons at Richmond before returning to Camberwell where he finished his career. Altogether he spent eight seasons at Camberwell, winning one Best and Fairest award and representing the VFA once. 

Henderson later became a prominent Victoria Police Force detective, and was known as “Hawkeye” because of his photographic memory. He was reputed to be able to stand on the steps of Flinders Street Station and arrest wanted criminals after memorising their photographs from the police wanted sheets. After retiring from the Police Force, Reg Henderson took a role as head of security at the Tasmanian Casino.

Notes

External links 

		
Reg Henderson's playing statistics from The VFA Project

1910 births
2003 deaths
Australian rules footballers from Victoria (Australia)
Richmond Football Club players
Camberwell Football Club players